Steven John Atkinson (October 16, 1948 – May 6, 2003) was a Canadian ice hockey player who played the positions of centre and right wing. He played in both the National Hockey League and World Hockey Association from 1969 to 1976.

Early life
Atkinson was born in Toronto, Ontario, but grew up in Barrie, Ontario. Guided by Hap Emms in Barrie, Emms would bring Atkinson along with him when he moved the Flyers from Barrie to Niagara Falls. On April 26, 1968, he scored the winning goal in Game 8 to eliminate the Kitchener Rangers in the OHL Championship Series on the way to a Flyers Memorial Cup title. Atkinson had 19 goals in 29 playoff games that year.

Career
Originally drafted in 1966 by the Boston Bruins, after the Bruins acquired the pick from the Detroit Red Wings in February 1966. In 1968-69 he joined the Bruins' affiliate the Oklahoma City Blazers of the Central Hockey League and scored 80 points in 65 games, winning rookie of the year.

Atkinson would join two expansion teams during his career. He was claimed by the Buffalo Sabres in the 1970 NHL Expansion Draft, and he spent four seasons with them. In the 1974 NHL Expansion Draft he would be claimed by the Washington Capitals. During his only season with the Capitals, he became the first player in franchise history to score on a penalty shot on February 1, 1975 against the Vancouver Canucks. Atkinson would also have a stint with the Toronto Toros of the World Hockey Association.

Personal
Atkinson died of a heart attack on May 6, 2003 at the age of 54.

Career statistics

Regular season and playoffs

References

External links

1948 births
2003 deaths
Boston Bruins players
Buffalo Norsemen players
Buffalo Sabres players
Canadian ice hockey right wingers
Boston Bruins draft picks
Erie Blades players
Ice hockey people from Simcoe County
National Hockey League first-round draft picks
Niagara Falls Flyers (1960–1972) players
Oklahoma City Blazers (1965–1977) players
Richmond Robins players
Toronto Toros players
Washington Capitals players
Sportspeople from Barrie
Ice hockey people from Toronto